Geitocochylis tarphionima is a species of moth of the family Tortricidae. It is endemic to Chihuahua, Mexico.

References

Moths described in 1984
Cochylini
Moths of Central America